Antoine Sader (born 24 August 1929) was a Lebanese sailor. He competed in the Flying Dutchman event at the 1960 Summer Olympics.

References

1929 births
Possibly living people
Lebanese male sailors (sport)
Olympic sailors of Lebanon
Sailors at the 1960 Summer Olympics – Flying Dutchman